The 1995 Florida State Seminoles baseball team represented Florida State University in the 1995 NCAA Division I baseball season. The Seminoles played their home games at Dick Howser Stadium, and played as part of the Atlantic Coast Conference. The team was coached by Mike Martin in his sixteenth season as head coach at Florida State.

The Seminoles reached the College World Series, their thirteenth appearance in Omaha, where they finished tied for fifth place after recording a win against  and losses to Miami (FL) and Southern California.

Personnel

Roster

Coaches

Schedule and results

References

Florida State Seminoles baseball seasons
Florida State Seminoles
College World Series seasons
Florida State Seminoles baseball
Florida State
Atlantic Coast Conference baseball champion seasons